Estlan is a rural locality (a settlement) in Oktyabrsky Selsoviet, Kulundinsky District, Altai Krai, Russia. The population was 43 as of 2013. There is 1 street.

Geography 
Estlan is located 14 km southwest of Kulunda (the district's administrative centre) by road. Novopetrovka is the nearest rural locality.

References 

Rural localities in Kulundinsky District